

Rango may refer to:

Media
Rango (1931 film), a quasi-documentary
Rango (2011 film), an animated comedy
Rango (video game), based on the 2011 film
Rango (TV series), a 1967 Western
"Rango" (song) (2013), by Catfish and the Bottlemen

Places
Commune of Rango, Kayanza Province, Burundi
Prangli, formerly known as Rango, an Estonian island

People
Rango Narayan Orpe (fl. 1660s–1680s), warrior and administrative officer of the Maratha Empire
Rango Bapuji Gupte (fl. 1840s–1850s), one of the leaders of the Indian Rebellion of 1857

See also
Rongo, god of cultivated food in Māori mythology